Brandon Timothy Jackson (born March 7, 1984) is an American actor and stand-up comedian. He is known for his roles in the films Roll Bounce (2005), Tropic Thunder (2008), Percy Jackson & the Olympians: The Lightning Thief (2010), Lottery Ticket (2010), Big Mommas: Like Father, Like Son (2011), Percy Jackson: Sea of Monsters (2013), and Roofie Jackson in Deadbeat (2014–2016).

Background
Jackson was born in Detroit, Michigan. His mother, Beverly Yvonne, is a pastor. His father, Bishop Wayne Timothy Jackson, is the senior pastor of Great Faith Ministries International, and author of the book Miracles Do Happen: The Power and Place of Miracles as a Sign to the World. His maternal grandfather, Royal Titus Bozeman, was a Pentecostal child preacher named a "Boy Wonder" by Indiana newspapers.

Career
Jackson attended West Bloomfield High School. After graduation, he moved to Los Angeles to pursue stand-up comedy and started at the Laugh Factory, as well as opened for Wayne Brady and Chris Tucker. His role as Junior in the film Roll Bounce won him the 2006 Black Reel Award for Breakthrough Performance. He hosted one episode of the Brandon T. Jackson Show on The N channel. In 2006, Jackson hosted the Up Close and Personal Tour, featuring Chris Brown, Ne-Yo, Lil Wayne, Juelz Santana and Dem Franchize Boyz. 

He was a cast member on the show Wild 'n Out with Nick Cannon, and then guest-starred as a celebrity team captain for the sixth season for the show. Jackson starred in the films Tropic Thunder as Alpa Chino, Percy Jackson as Grover Underwood and  Lottery Ticket as Benny. He played 17-year-old Trent Pierce in Big Mommas: Like Father, Like Son (the sequel to Big Momma's House 2).
He had a cameo in 'The Glee Project' season 2 video 'Here I Go Again' and can be seen when Maxfield gives him a flyer. In 2013, he played Axel Foley's son in an unaired pilot for a Beverly Hills Cop TV series.

Filmography

Film

Television

Awards and nominations

Singles
 Imma Do It Big (featuring T-Pain and One Chance)

References

External links
 

1984 births
Living people
American male film actors
African-American stand-up comedians
American stand-up comedians
American male writers
Black Hebrew Israelite people
Midwest hip hop musicians
Rappers from Michigan
African-American male actors
American male television actors
American male voice actors
Comedians from Michigan
21st-century American comedians
21st-century American male musicians
21st-century African-American musicians
20th-century African-American people